Lawrence Williams, Jr. (born February 9, 1933) is an American former Negro league outfielder who played for the Kansas City Monarchs in 1954 and 1955.

A native of LaGrange, Georgia, Williams once clubbed four doubles in a game for the Monarchs.

References

External links
Lawrence Williams at Negro Leagues Baseball Museum

Kansas City Monarchs players
1933 births
Living people
Baseball outfielders
21st-century African-American people